The 2008 World Junior Table Tennis Championships were held in Madrid, Spain, from 6 to 13 December 2008. It was organised by the Real Federacion Española de Tenis de Mesa under the auspices and authority of the International Table Tennis Federation (ITTF).

Medal summary

Events

Medal table

See also

2008 World Team Table Tennis Championships

References

World Junior Table Tennis Championships
World Junior Table Tennis Championships
World Junior Table Tennis Championships
World Junior Table Tennis Championships
Table tennis in Spain
International sports competitions hosted by Spain
World Junior Table Tennis Championships